Islamic State Health Service (ISHS) (Arabic: الخدمات الصحية للدولة الإسلامية) is a healthcare service ran by the Islamic State, it was first shown in a propaganda video, the video and logo resembled an NHS logo and video presentation.

History 
It was first shown in 2015 in a propaganda video to show the "western media" is lying, and to show health advancements that the Islamic State has done, the service was explained by a Melbourne-born Australian, under the alias of Abu Yusuf.  The first buildings to be created with ISHS was developed in Raqqa, Syria and Mosul, Iraq.  It would then start growing in Iraq more in places like Mosul and Tikrit, this would also boost more propaganda calling for Sunni Muslims, specifically British and Australian to join the Islamic State and join the medical forces there.  It was also reported that many female physicians were executed and were replaced by male doctors in ISHS-ran hospitals.  The service provided mass polio vaccines and cancer treatment for people living under Islamic State rule in Mosul hospitals.  The United States air force would take out hospitals used to treat militants to slow down the Islamic State's fighting, and put an end to most of the hospitals ran by ISHS.

References 

Islamic State of Iraq and the Levant
Health care companies
Health care in Asia